The Dry River is a perennial river of the Mitchell River catchment, located in the Alpine region of the Australian state of Victoria.

Features and location
The river flows generally north by east, before reaching its confluence with the Wonnangatta River, southwest of Mount Selwyn, in the Shire of Wellington. The river descends  over its  course.

See also

 Rivers of Australia

References

External links
 
 

East Gippsland catchment
Rivers of Gippsland (region)
Victorian Alps